Charles James Thompson (January 24, 1862 – March 27, 1932) was a U.S. Representative from Ohio from 1919 to 1931.

Biography 
Born in Wapakoneta, Ohio, Thompson attended the public schools and the Ohio Wesleyan University, Delaware, Ohio.
Learned the art of printing 1876–1879.
He worked as a journeyman printer in various cities in Ohio, Indiana, and Illinois 1879–1884.
He returned to Wapakoneta in 1885 and was employed as a bookkeeper until 1889.
He moved to Defiance, Ohio, in 1889 and was owner and publisher of the Defiance Express until 1902.
He served as member of the Republican State central committee in 1893 and 1894.
Postmaster of Defiance 1898–1915.
He was an unsuccessful candidate for mayor in 1915.

Congress 
Thompson was elected as a Republican to the Sixty-sixth and to the five succeeding Congresses (March 4, 1919 – March 3, 1931).
He was an unsuccessful candidate for reelection in 1930 to the Seventy-second Congress.

Later life
He retired from business pursuits.
He died in  Albuquerque, New Mexico, while on a visit, March 27, 1932.
He was interred in Riverside Cemetery, Defiance, Ohio.

Sources

1862 births
1932 deaths
People from Wapakoneta, Ohio
People from Defiance, Ohio
Ohio Wesleyan University alumni
19th-century American newspaper publishers (people)
Journalists from Ohio
Burials in Ohio
Republican Party members of the United States House of Representatives from Ohio